Stefanos Petrakis (17 December 1924 – 8 May 2022) was a Greek sprinter.

Born in Athens, Greece, he competed in the 1948 Summer Olympics and in the 1952 Summer Olympics. He was also the 100 metres champion for Greece at the 1951 Mediterranean Games. At the 1955 Mediterranean Games he was eliminated in the 100 metres semi-final.

References

External links
 

1924 births
2022 deaths
Greek male sprinters
Olympic athletes of Greece
Athletes (track and field) at the 1948 Summer Olympics
Athletes (track and field) at the 1952 Summer Olympics
Athletes from Athens
Mediterranean Games gold medalists for Greece
Mediterranean Games medalists in athletics
Athletes (track and field) at the 1951 Mediterranean Games
Athletes (track and field) at the 1955 Mediterranean Games
20th-century Greek people